ICIC may refer to:

International Committee on Intellectual Cooperation, an advisory organization for the League of Nations
 International Credit and Investment Company, the former holding company of Bank of Credit and Commerce International
Inter-cell interference coordination, a management technology for mobile telecommunications 
Islamic Committee of the International Crescent, a relief organisation
Israeli Credit Insurance Company, a subsidiary of the credit insurance company Euler Hermes